Mbukushu or Thimbukushu is a Bantu language spoken by 45,000 people along the Okavango River in Namibia, where it is a national language, and in Botswana, Angola and Zambia.

In 2022 it was selected among a variety of Mother Tongue languages to be taught in Botswana Primary Schools in the year 2023.

Mbukushu  is one of several Bantu languages of the Okavango which have click consonants; Mbukushu has three: tenuis c, voiced gc, and nasalized nc, as well as prenasalized ngc, which vary between speakers as dental, palatal, and postalveolar. It also has a nasal glottal approximant.

References

External links
 Mbukushu sound files at UCLA

Bantu languages
Languages of Angola
Languages of Botswana
Languages of Namibia
Languages of Zambia
Click languages